"Joshua" is a song written and recorded by American country music artist Dolly Parton.  It was released on November 9, 1970 as the first single and title track from the album Joshua.  The song was significant for being her first single to reach number 1 on the US country charts. The single reached number 1 on the Billboard country charts in February 1971.  Parton received her first Grammy nomination in the Best Country Female Vocal category for the song, losing to Lynn Anderson.

Background
The song drew on many Appalachian references from Parton's youth which she would revisit throughout her career.

Content
The song is about an adventurous young girl who dares to visit the property of a rural recluse, who has a reputation for being mean and hostile.

Chart performance
Weekly

Year-End

External links

Joshua lyrics at Dolly Parton On-Line

References

1970 songs
Dolly Parton songs
1970 singles
Songs written by Dolly Parton
RCA Records singles
Song recordings produced by Bob Ferguson (musician)